The Burlington County Board of County Commissioners (formerly called The Burlington County Board of Chosen Freeholders) is a board of five people who govern Burlington County, New Jersey. The board is headed by two people: the director and the deputy director. They are chosen by the board. The current director is Felicia Hopson and the deputy director is Commissioner Tom Pullion.

Responsibilities 
As a local government the board is mostly responsible for governing the county and setting a budget.

Party affiliation

Sessions

2019 
During the 2018 elections, candidate George Youngkin faced allegations of domestic abuse and dropped out of the race; however, he was still on the ballot, and was subsequently elected to the Board. He resigned from the Board on January 2, 2019, one day after becoming a Commissioner. He was replaced with Daniel J. O'Connell.

Previous Sessions

References 

Burlington County, New Jersey
Burlington